Sriram Venkatakrishnan (born 22 June 1966) is an Indian entrepreneur, columnist, music historian and heritage activist. He had his schooling in Madras and Calcutta. His Bachelors in engineering from the Delhi College of Engineering in 1987 was followed by a masters in business administration specializing in marketing and advertising from Delhi University. Sriram then moved on to a varied career in marketing and advertising before joining his family businesses in Industrial Hydraulics and Software.

Works

Heritage Walks

Sriram pioneered the concept of heritage walks in Chennai. This was in 1999, when he led a heritage walk in Mylapore
. Since then his monthly heritage tours in different areas of the city and his quarterly heritage tours in other parts of India have attracted a wide audience. As of 2018, Sriram has completed 75 different historic tours in Chennai and elsewhere. Further details on his web sites www.sriramv.com and www.pastforward.in

Other Details

Sriram is a regular columnist with The Hindu and is Associate Editor of Madras Musings, the fortnightly brought out by S Muthiah, the city's best-known chronicler. He is currently one of the four Secretaries of the Music Academy, Madras, in which capacity he is the Convenor of its Annual Conference. Sriram's blog Madras Heritage and Carnatic Music is a popular site for trivia on the two subjects that he writes on. He was also Convenor of the Chennai Chapter of the Indian National Trust for Arts and Cultural Heritage during 2012/13.

References

1966 births
Living people
Music historians